Atiaia is a genus of beetles in the family Cerambycidae, containing the following species:

 Atiaia consobrina (Gahan, 1892)
 Atiaia testaceicornis (Melzer, 1923)

References

Cerambycini